Maria Tran (Vietnamese: Maria Trần) (born 30 January 1985) is an Vietnamese-Australian actress, martial artist, producer, and director based in Las Vegas, Nevada. She is known for developing the martial arts action film genre in Australia via the Asian diaspora communities of Western Sydney through her shorts such as Hit Girls, Gaffa, Enter The Dojo, Operation Kung Flu; her contributions on Australian television; Maximum Choppage and movies outside of Australia; Roger Corman's Fist of the Dragon, Death Mist, Vietnamese action blockbuster Tracer and Echo 8. Tran has been cast as "Tien" in the Last King of the Cross 10 x 1 hour TV series, which will be shown on Paramount+.

Early life and Education 
Tran was born in Brisbane, Australia, to Vietnamese parents who were boat people from Vietnam. Her father was a former soldier in the South Vietnam Army and her mother worked in publicity. They became refugee migrants to Sydney in the 1980s and the family moved often due to work. 

She went to Dinmore State School, Camira State School and then moved to Sydney and attended Villawood Public School, Fairfield West Public School and attended Westfields Sports High School, Sunnybank High School, and Canley Vale High School.

Tran began taking taekwondo lessons in 1998. She left home at 16 to enter a martial arts competition in Queensland. She returned to Sydney a year later to finish school; she graduated in 2002.. She graduated with a Bachelor of Psychology at the University of Western Sydney, in 2007. 

She has a younger sister, Elizabeth H. Vu, a frequent collaborating screenwriter.

Career

Community Work 
In 2007, Tran enrolled in a free community film making workshop called the Youth Digital Cultures film program through Information & Cultural Exchange (ICE). She completed it and took over the coordinator's role and worked as an educator running programs for at risk young people from culturally diverse backgrounds. She has guest lectured several instances at the Australian National University on filmmaking and digital media. In 2013, Tran directed her first theatre production working with students from Fairfield High School and Lurnea High School called "Press Play"; a multimedia and interactive journey of young people from migrant backgrounds.

Tran was elected as vice-president (External Affairs) for the Vietnamese Community of Australia – New South Wales (VCA-NSW) from 2013 to 2015. She volunteered in various capacities and was invited to speak at the 2014 National Youth Vietnamese Conference held in Melbourne on the issues of Vietnamese-Australians in film, television and the media.

Filmmaking 
In 2008, Tran's documentary-drama Happy Dent won Shortcuts Film Festival for Best Film and Achievement in Directing. This award lead her to a meeting with a TV network executive and she went on to make TV micro series "Downtown Rumble", 6 part kung fu action micro series which aired at the end of that year.

In 2009, Tran was awarded the Metroscreen Multicultural Mentorship Scheme for her short film script "A Little Dream", which was granted seed funding and Tran directed the film with the mentorship by Khoa Do.

In 2011, Tran pursued documentary filmmaking with her quirky self transmedia documentary "Quest for Jackie!" which is about a young girl's filmmaking plight as well as meeting her action idol; Jackie Chan. She travel to Brisbane, Darwin, Perth, Adelaide, Melbourne, Tasmania in 21 days to connect with Jackie Chan fans and stories of the "underdog". With hundreds of hours of footage, this project remains incomplete. In July, 2016, Screen NSW gave Tran a stunt attachment position on board of Jackie Chan's movie "Bleeding Steel" as it shoots in Sydney. She has been learning from the Jackie Chan Stunt Team, met Jackie and was invited to go on a road trip to Camberra with him.

She was also the 2011 NSW State Champion and represented the state at National Film Pitching Competition held at Metroscreen.

In 2012, she directed and produced many short action films with Trung Ly and Adrian Castro with subsequent works such as Enter The Dojo, Gaffa, and award-winning action comedy Hit Girls; which she wrote, produced and directed. Tran was also a recipient of the Screen NSW Emerging Producer Placement in the same year.

In 2013, she was approached by Cancer Council and Information & Cultural Exchange (ICE) to produced and directed the movie Change of Our Lives. The film was officially selected for the Viet Film Festival 2014.

Tran worked on Fist of the Dragon in Nanhai, China as killer assassin "Zhen" as well as fight supervisor for fight choreographer Trung Ly and director Antony Szeto in 2014.

Tran played Phuong Lua in the Vietnamese martial arts action film Tracer (Truy Sat). The film made its Australian debut through Dreamwest Pictures in May 2016.

In 2016 Tran wrote an original screenplay for a Vietnamese historical epic The Drums of Me Linh as well as action comedy Fury of the Far East; combining martial arts expertise and the supernatural, was awarded seed funding from ICE's Produce Perfect program to be developed into a proof of concept for television. The Drums of Me Linh was selected by Lost in Books to be made into a bilingual children's book, written by Tran in collaboration with illustrator Britney Fong. Fury of the Far East evolved into Tiger Cops which was funded through the ABC Freshblood scheme.

In 2017, Tran officially set up film production company Phoenix Eye as she received an artist-in-residency with Powerhouse Youth Theatre where her company lives.

The same year, she produced, wrote and directed "The Subtractor"; a mockumentary short film about an Asian lead breaking into Hollywood. This film was commissioned by Diverse Arts Australia and was selected to be pitched at the 2017 Video Junkee Festival.

Tran occasionally teaches at AFTRS via the Open Program in Stage Combat/ Fight Choreography and the holiday filmmaking programs and run workshops in regional NSW.

Tran is set to make a directorial debut on her self-funded feature film action thriller "Echo 8" in production in early 2020 co-starring with Japanese actor Takashi Hara.

Filmography

Film

Television

Awards 
 Selected as 40 Under 40 Most Influential Asian-Australians 2021
Tran was the recipient of the Create NSW 2018 Western Sydney Fellowship. She was awarded $50,000 for her year long career development and project "Femme Fatales: Seen and Heard".
 Tran was nominated and won the Breakout Female Action Star (Feature Film Category) at the 2016 Action on Film International Festival for her role "Zhen" in Roger Corman's Fist of the Dragon.
 Tran won the Breakout Action Actress award at the 2013 Action on Film International Festival for her portrayal of the character Charlie Vu in the female assassin comedy, Hit Girls[17]. This award was also shared with actress Juju Chan.
Short film "Happy Dent", which Tran directed won Best Film and Achievement in Directing at the 2008 Shortcuts Film Festival.
Short film "Gaffa", which Tran produced won the HOYTS People's Choice Awards at the 2009 Joyhouse Film Festival.
She is the People's Choice and Runners Up for "Dreamgirls" multicultural pageant in 2014
Tran has been selected as part of the 2016 Ones to Watch Producers in Australia.

References

External links 

Tran's TEDxYouth@Sydney 2017

Living people
1985 births
Actresses from Brisbane
Actresses of Vietnamese descent
Vietnamese film actresses
Vietnamese film directors
Vietnamese women film directors
Australian people of Vietnamese descent